Theodore Harvey Barrett was an American Brevet Brigadier General who commanded the 1st Missouri Colored Infantry Regiment in the later years of the American Civil War and was known as the commander of the Battle of Palmito Ranch which was the final battle of the war.

Biography
Theodore was born on August 27, 1834. Barrett enlisted on September 15, 1862, as a 2nd Lieutenant of the 9th Minnesota Infantry Regiment at Company G but wouldn't see active service as the 9th Minnesota was organized to engage in skirmish with Native American tribes. On December 29, 1863, he was transferred to the 1st Missouri Colored Infantry Regiment where he became a Colonel of the regiment which served in the Department of the Gulf in Louisiana until June 1864. Afterwards, the Regiment was ordered to head for Texas. Barrett was brevetted Brigadier General on March 13, 1865, for "faithful and meritorious services".

He then organized a unofficial truce with the Confederates there around March until Barrett dispatched the 1st Missouri, the 34th Indiana and the 2nd Texas to raid a Confederate camp near Fort Brown but were driven back after some Mexican witnesses reported them to the Confederates due to a few skirmishes between them and the Union forces. On the next day, John "Rip" Ford engaged in a battle with Barrett at the Battle of Palmito Ranch and despite the Confederate victory at the battle, it was all in vain as Ford's forces would surrender 2 weeks later. Barrett was then discharged on January 19, 1866, and returned to Herman, Minnesota where he died on July 20, 1900, and was buried at Riverside Cemetery, Sterling, Illinois.

Legacy
Barrett, Minnesota is named after Barrett after its establishment on 1887.

See also
List of American Civil War brevet generals (Union)

References

1834 births
1900 deaths
Union Army generals
People from Wyoming County, New York
Union Army colonels
People of Minnesota in the American Civil War